Salisbury railway station is a railway station and bus interchange in the northern Adelaide suburb of Salisbury. It is on the Gawler line,  from Adelaide station. Adjoining it is a large park & ride carpark, making it one of the busiest stations on the Adelaide suburban rail system.

History

The railway line through Salisbury opened in June 1857, initially running north as far as Smithfield.  The line was extended to Gawler and Kapunda in 1860 and Burra by 1870 to exploit the copper mining boom in those areas.

The line through Salisbury became the South Australian Railways' broad gauge Main North line, used by a variety of local and country trains, and also by passengers and freight travelling long distances to Broken Hill, Alice Springs and Kalgoorlie, (although all these interstate journeys involved changing trains at break-of-gauge stations).

In 1925, a junction was installed north of Salisbury when a new line was built to Redhill, in the state's mid-north. By 1937, this line was extended to Port Pirie and was used by the broad gauge East-West express, which connected with the Commonwealth Railways Trans-Australian service to Kalgoorlie.

In 1941, a second junction was installed north of Salisbury, from which a  branch line served a large, hurriedly built World War II munitions complex at Penfield, the area is now known as Edinburgh. During the war years, many hundreds of workers were conveyed to three stations on the central line of the branch since Salisbury was a largely rural community and most of the workforce had to be brought in from other districts. The central line terminated in a balloon loop to enable trains to return to Adelaide without locomotives having to "change ends" of their train. Several miles of sidings ran from the central line to munitions buildings, which were very widely separated for safety reasons. A more limited peak hour service to Penfield continued after the war, serving staff at the UK and Australian governments' Weapons Research Establishment, later to become the Defence Science and Technology Organisation. All trains were withdrawn in January 1991, due to low patronage and the need to fund an upgrade of the degraded track.

The final branch line in the area was a 700-metre access line into the Holden car plant at Elizabeth, opened in 1959. The last passenger train on the Holden branch ran in August 1992, and the remaining freight traffic stopped when the Melbourne to Adelaide line was converted to standard gauge in 1995.

In March 1978, all non-metropolitan railways in South Australia were sold to the Federal Government and placed under the control of Australian National (AN). Railways in the metropolitan area were retained by the State Government owned State Transport Authority (STA). The lines through Salisbury and on to Gawler remained with the STA, since they were part of the suburban system. AN had responsibility for the Port Pirie line from Salisbury Junction northwards, but needed to run its trains over STA tracks between Adelaide and Salisbury.

In 1982, AN converted the broad gauge Salisbury Junction to Port Pirie line to standard gauge (and diverted it to Crystal Brook at the northern end). A new standard gauge line was built through the Salisbury station area, completely separate from the broad gauge tracks and passing west of the Gawler line platforms. This was a single line, with no platform or any other infrastructure provided at Salisbury. This is still the situation at Salisbury today, although ownership and responsibilities have now transferred from AN to the Australian Rail Track Corporation and from the STA to Adelaide Metro.

On 17 December 1985, Salisbury station was opened as a major bus/rail interchange by State Premier John Bannon and Federal Minister for Transport Peter Morris. This was the second purpose-built transport interchange in the Adelaide metropolitan area (the first had been at Noarlunga Centre). The historic stone 1857 building on the down (west) platform, which also included a signal box, was demolished when the standard gauge line opened. The station retained a staffed ticket and information office until (circa 2005?) at which time it was closed.

In October 2002, the level crossing on Park Terrace, immediately south of the station platforms was the scene of a fatal collision between The Ghan, several cars and a bus. Since then, buses to and from the bus interchange have been re-routed away from the level crossing and locking pedestrian gates installed. This is the first installation of this type of level crossing protection in South Australia.

In 2017, ticket validation gates were installed at the station to combat fare evasion, and were activated on September 11. Similar gates were installed some time ago at Adelaide station, and have been proposed for Noarlunga Centre.

Services by platform 

A number of suburban trains heading towards Gawler cross to the southbound track at Salisbury, and use Platform 2 rather than the usual northbound Platform 1. This gives passengers more convenient cross-platform access to the bus stops and eliminates the need for alighting passengers to cross the rail tracks. Trains revert to their normal track on departure.

A short siding north of the station was used to terminate and reverse several trains in the weekday peak-hours. From 27 April 2008, trains no longer terminate here with all services continuing to Gawler. It is the last remnant of the former branch line to Penfield. Currently, there is one service will terminate at Salisbury (07:51 from Adelaide, arriving Salisbury at 08:12), and using the short siding of branch line to Penfield and reverse back to Adelaide.

Transport links
Adelaide Metro operate 14 bus routes via Salisbury Interchange:
224/224F/224X: Elizabeth station to City
225/225M/225F/225M to city via para vista, Mawson lakes and gepps cross
400/400A: to Salisbury North
401: to Paralowie
403: to Salisbury North
404/404P: to Paralowie anti-clockswise loop
405: to Paralowie clockwise loop
411/411U/411B: to Mawson Interchange
415/415H/415V: to Greenwith
421: to  RAAF Base Edinburgh
430: to Elizabeth station
500: to City
502/502X to city via ingle farm/paradise and klemzig station
560/560A/560B/560P: to Westfield Tea Tree Plaza
900: to Elizabeth station

References

External links

Flickr gallery

Railway stations in Adelaide
Railway stations in Australia opened in 1857